Maisel's Indian Trading Post was located in the city of  Albuquerque, county of  Bernalillo, in the U.S. state of New Mexico. It was added to the New Mexico State Register of Cultural Properties and the National Register of Historic Places listings in Bernalillo County, New Mexico in 1993. Maisel’s was closed permanently in late April, 2020, during the COVID-19 shut down.

Store
Established by Maurice and Cyma Maisel in 1939 to cater to the new U.S. Route 66 tourist trade, this Pueblo Deco building was designed by architect John Gaw Meem. The building features murals designed by Olive Rush. Various murals depicting Indian life were painted by ten Pueblo and Navajo artists such as Narcisco Abeyta, Harrison Begay, and Awa Tsireh The trading post employed hundreds of native craftspeople in its heyday. It closed upon its founder's death, only to be reopened in the 1980s by Maurice’s grandson, Skip. It continued to trade as Skip Maisel's Indian Jewelry and Crafts, until summer of 2019, when Skip Maisel retired and closed the business.

References

External links 

Commercial buildings on the National Register of Historic Places in New Mexico
U.S. Route 66 in New Mexico
Tourist attractions along U.S. Route 66
Commercial buildings in Albuquerque, New Mexico
Commercial buildings completed in 1939
Pueblo Deco architecture
Trading posts in the United States
National Register of Historic Places in Albuquerque, New Mexico
New Mexico State Register of Cultural Properties